Alfred Whitford (Fred) Lerdahl (born March 10, 1943, in Madison, Wisconsin) is the Fritz Reiner Professor Emeritus of Musical Composition at Columbia University, and a composer and music theorist best known for his work on musical grammar and cognition, rhythmic theory, pitch space, and cognitive constraints on compositional systems. He has written many orchestral and chamber works, three of which were finalists for the Pulitzer Prize for Music: Time after Time in 2001, String Quartet No. 3 in 2010, and Arches in 2011.

Life 
Lerdahl studied with James Ming at Lawrence University, where he earned his BMus in 1965, and with Milton Babbitt, Edward T. Cone, and Earl Kim at Princeton University, where he earned his MFA in 1967. At Tanglewood he studied with Arthur Berger in 1964 and Roger Sessions in 1966. He then studied with Wolfgang Fortner at the Hochschule für Musik in Freiburg/Breisgau in 1968–69, on a Fulbright Scholarship. From 1991 to 2018 Lerdahl was Fritz Reiner Professor of Musical Composition at Columbia University; previously he taught at the University of Michigan, Harvard University, and the University of California at Berkeley. Lerdahl was awarded an honorary doctorate from Lawrence University in 1999. He is a member of the American Academy of Arts and Letters.

Lerdahl's maternal uncle was the astronomer Albert Whitford.

Lerdahl has written three books: A Generative Theory of Tonal Music (1983, second edition 1996, with linguist Ray Jackendoff, MIT Press), Tonal Pitch Space (2001, Oxford University Press), and Composition and Cognition (2019, University of California Press). He has also written numerous articles on music theory, music cognition, computer-assisted composition, and other topics.

Lerdahl's music is published by Schott, and Bridge Records is producing an ongoing series of recordings of it. Lerdahl's students include composers Christopher Buchenholz, Zosha Di Castri, R. Luke DuBois, John Halle, Huck Hodge, Arthur Kampela, Alex Mincek, Paul Moravec, Matthew Ricketts, Allen Shearer, Kate Soper, Tyshawn Sorey, Christopher Trapani, Carl Voss, Wang Lu, Eric Wubbels, and Nina Young; and music theorists Elizabeth Margulis and David Temperley.

Music
Lerdahl's influences include the German classics, Sibelius, Schoenberg, Bartók, Stravinsky, Carter, Messiaen, and Ligeti. He has said he “always sought musical forms of [his] own invention,” and to discover the appropriate form for the intended expression. In Fanfare, Robert Carl wrote: "Lerdahl is a profoundly musical composer, engaged in all his work in a rigorous and respectful dialogue with tradition, eager to imbue his pieces with the maximum of both information and clarity."<ref>{{Cite journal|last=Carl|first=Robert|date=January–February 2007|title=LERDAHL Time after Time.^ Marches.^ Oboe Quartet.^ Waves' • Jeffrey Milarsky, cond, Columbia Sinfonietta;' Antares;^ La Fenice;^ Orpheus CO • BRIDGE 9191 (60:24)|url=http://fanfarearchive.com/indices/itop/issues/h1_5910.html|journal=Fanfare|issue=January–February 2007}}</ref> Of Lerdahl's composition Waves, Phillip Scott wrote, "Waves is an orchestral scherzo. It conjures up (rather than depicts) the motion and the sense of waves, not merely of the oceanic variety but also those found on graphs: sound waves, heartbeats, and so on. It begins with a surge of activity and never lets up in its cascading scales and rapid figuration. Unlike Debussy's La mer, whose deep-sea swells it recalls only fleetingly, it has no moments of repose."

 List of compositions 

 Orchestral 
 Chords, large orchestra (12 winds, 11 brass, harp, piano, percussion, violas, cellos, double basses), 1974–83
 Cross-Currents, large orchestra (12 winds, 10 brass, harp, piano, percussion, strings), 1987
 Waves, small orchestra (8 winds, 2 French horns, strings), 1988
 Without Fanfare, small orchestra (12 winds, 11 brass, 3 percussion), 1994
 Quiet Music, large orchestra (12 winds, 11 brass, harp, piano, percussion, strings), 1994 (also version for 2 pianos)
 Spirals, orchestra (8 winds, 2 French horns, 2 trumpets, piano, percussion, strings), 2006
 Arches, cello, small orchestra (22 players), 2011
 Time and Again, small orchestra, 2014

 Chamber music 
 String Trio, violin, viola, cello, 1966
 Imitations, flute, harp, viola, 1977, revised 2001
 String Quartet No. 1, 1978, revised 2008
 Waltzes, violin, viola, cello, double bass, 1981
 Episodes and Refrains, flute, oboe, clarinet, French horn, bassoon, 1982
 Fantasy Etudes, flute, clarinet, violin, cello, piano, percussion, 1985
 Marches, clarinet, violin, cello, piano, 1992
 Time after Time, flute, clarinet, violin, cello, piano, percussion, 2000
 Imbrications, flute, clarinet, violin, cello, piano, percussion, 2001
 Oboe Quartet, oboe, violin, viola, cello, 2002
 Duo, violin, piano, 2005
 String Quartet No. 2, 1982–2010
 String Quartet No. 3, 2008
 Arches, cello, ensemble (flute, oboe, clarinet, bassoon, French horn, trumpet, trombone, harp, 2 violins, viola, double bass, piano, 2 percussion), 2010 (also version for cello, small orchestra [22 players])
 There and Back Again, cello, 2010
 Times 3, violin, cello, piano, 2012
 Give and Take, violin, cello, 2014
 String Quartet no. 4 "Chaconne", 2016
 Three Bagatelles, violin, guitar, 2016
 Duo, cello, piano, 2017
 Chords, version for 13 instruments, 2018
 Cyclic Descent, piano and large ensemble, 2018
 Solitude, flute, clarinet, piano, 2020

 Choral 
 Cornstalks (text by Richard Wilbur), 16 mixed voices, 2012

 Vocal 
 Wake (text by James Joyce), soprano, harp, violin, viola, cello, 3 percussion, 1967–68
 Aftermath (dramatic cantata, text by the composer), soprano, alto, baritone, 2 flutes, 2 oboes, 2 clarinets, 2 bassoons, harp, 2 violins, viola, cello, double bass), 1973
 Eros (text by Ezra Pound), mezzo-soprano, alto flute, harp, electric guitar, viola, bass guitar, piano, 2 percussion, 1975
 Beyond the Realm of Bird (text by Emily Dickinson), soprano, orchestra (8 winds, French horn, trumpet, trombone, harp, piano, percussion, strings), 1984
 The First Voices (text by Jean-Jacques Rousseau, translated by John H. Moran and Alexander Gode), soprano, mezzo-soprano, alto, 8 percussion, 2007
 Fire and Ice (text by Robert Frost), high soprano, double bass, 2015

 Piano 
 Piano Fantasy, 1964
 Quiet Music, 2 pianos, 2001 (version of orchestral work)
 Three Diatonic Studies, 2004–09
 Embedded Loops, 2 pianos, 2020

 Discography 
 String Quartet No. 1 (original version). Juilliard String Quartet (Composers Recordings, Inc.: CRI 551, 1987 [reissued as New World Records: NWCR551, 2007])
 Waltzes; Fantasy Etudes; Eros; Wake. Bethany Beardslee, soprano; Beverly Morgan, mezzo-soprano; Rolf Schulte, violin; Scott Nickrenz, viola; Fred Sherry, cello; Donald Palma, double bass; Robert Beaser/Musical Elements; David Epstein/Boston Symphony Chamber Players; Fred Lerdahl/Collage (Composers Recordings, Inc.: CRI 580, 1991 [reissued as New World Records: NWCR580, 2007; Bridge Records: 9269; Bridge Records: 9391; and New World Records: NWCRL378])
 Waves. Orpheus Chamber Orchestra (Deutsche Grammophon: 435 389–2, 1992, reissued as Bridge Records: 9191)
 Fantasy Etudes. eighth blackbird (eighth blackbird, 1999)
 Time after Time; Marches; Oboe Quartet; Waves. Antares; La Fenice; Jeffrey Milarsky/Columbia Sinfonietta; Orpheus Chamber Orchestra (Bridge Records: 9191, 2006, reissue of Deutsche Grammophon: 435 389-2)
 Cross-Currents; Waltzes; Duo; Quiet Music (original version). Rolf Schulte, violin; Scott Nickrenz, viola; Fred Sherry, cello; Donald Palma, double bass; James Winn, piano; Paul Mann/Odense Symphony (Bridge Records: 9269, 2008 [partial reissue of Composers Recordings, Inc.: CRI 580, New World Records: NWCR580])
 String Trio; Piano Fantasy. Robert Miller, piano; members of The Composers Quartet (New World Records: NWCRL319, c. 2009)
 String Quartets Nos. 1–3. Daedalus Quartet (Bridge Records: 9352, 2011)
 The First Voices. Frank Epstein/New England Conservatory Percussion Ensemble (Naxos Records: 8.559684, 2011)
 Eros. Beverly Morgan, mezzo-soprano; Fred Lerdahl/Collage (New World Records: NWCRL378, 2011, reissue of Composers Recordings, Inc.: CRI 580)
 Spirals; Three Diatonic Studies; Imbrications; Wake; Fantasy Etudes. Bethany Beardslee, soprano; Mirka Viitala, piano; eighth blackbird; Michel Galante/Argento Ensemble; David Epstein/Boston Symphony Chamber Players; Scott Yoo/Odense Symphony (Bridge Records: 9391, 2013, reissue of Composers Recordings, Inc.: CRI 580, New World Records: NWCR580)
 There and Back Again. Anssi Karttunen, cello (Toccata Classics: TOCC0171, 2013)
 There and Back Again, String Quartet no. 4 "Chaconne", Fire and Ice, Three Bagatelles, Arches (orchestral version). (Bridge Records: 9522, 2020)

Awards

1966, Koussevitzky Composition Prize
1967, MacDowell Colony Fellowship
1971, 1988 Composer Award from the American Academy of Arts and Letters
1974, Guggenheim Fellowship
1977, Naumburg Recording Award
1982, Martha Baird Rockefeller Recording Award
1991, National Endowment for the Humanities Fellowship
1999, Doctor of Fine Arts (honorary degree), Lawrence University
2001, Finalist, Pulitzer Prize for Music (for Time after Time)
2002, ASCAP-Deems Taylor Special Recognition Award (for Tonal Pitch Space)2003, Wallace Berry Distinguished Book Award (for Tonal Pitch Space)2010, Finalist, Pulitzer Prize for Music (for String Quartet No. 3)
2010, Member, American Academy for Arts and Letters
2011, Finalist, Pulitzer Prize for Music (for Arches)

Bibliography
Lerdahl, Fred (1992). Cognitive Constraints on Compositional Systems, Contemporary Music Review 6 (2), pp. 97–121.
Lerdahl, Fred and Jackendoff, Ray (1983). A Generative Theory of Tonal Music. MIT Press. .
Lerdahl, Fred (2001). Tonal Pitch Space. Oxford University Press. 
Lerdahl, Fred (2019). Composition and Cognition: Reflections on Contemporary Music and the Musical Mind. University of California Press. 

 See also 
Music cognition
Generative theory of tonal music

References

External links
Fred Lerdahl at Schott Music
Fred Lerdahl at Project Schott New York
Faculty Page at Columbia University
Fred Lerdahl's Homepage
"Fred Lerdahl", bussigel''
New Music Box asks Fred Lerdahl: What role has theory played in your compositions and how important is it for people to know the theory behind the music in order to appreciate it?

American male classical composers
American classical composers
21st-century classical composers
1943 births
Living people
American music theorists
Lawrence University alumni
Princeton University alumni
Pupils of Roger Sessions
Pupils of Wolfgang Fortner
21st-century American composers
University of Michigan faculty
21st-century American male musicians
Columbia University faculty
Members of the American Academy of Arts and Letters